Andreas Miaoulis (1938 – 31 August 2010) was a commissioner of the Hellenic Basketball Federation. 

He was elected as president of Hellenic Basketball Federation in 2002. In 2010, he died from cancer in Athens, Greece. As a tribute, a minute's silence was held before Greece's game against Ivory Coast during the 2010 FIBA World Championship.

References 

1938 births
2010 deaths
Greek basketball executives and administrators
Greek businesspeople
Deaths from cancer in Greece